The Western Michigan Broncos men's ice hockey team is a National Collegiate Athletic Association (NCAA) Division I college ice hockey program that represents Western Michigan University. The Broncos are a member of the National Collegiate Hockey Conference (NCHC). They play at Lawson Arena in Kalamazoo, Michigan, United States.

History
The Broncos program began in 1973 and joined the Central Collegiate Hockey Association (CCHA) for the 1975–76 season. After ten seasons in the league Western Michigan won the 1986 CCHA Playoff Tournament and advanced to the school's first NCAA Division I men's ice hockey tournament in 1986. The 1986 season marked the program's first CCHA Tournament Championship and the program's first bid to the NCAA Tournament. The Broncos entered the tournament in the West Regional against Harvard and lost the two-game aggregate series, being outscored 11–4 by the Crimson.

Western Michigan's next post season appearance came in 1994. Western Michigan received an at-large bid to the 1994 NCAA Division I Tournament and again fell in the first round with a 6–3 loss to Wisconsin.

The Broncos rebounded in the 1995–96 season after a sub-.500 season in 1994–95. Western Michigan received the program's second at-large bid to the NCAA Tournament. Western Michigan lost again in the first round to Clarkson 6–1.

Under first-year coach Jeff Blashill, Western Michigan received an at-large bid to the 2011 NCAA Division I Men's Ice Hockey Tournament, where they would lose their opening game 3–2 in double overtime to Denver.  Denver scored two goals in the last 4:29 of the third period to force overtime.

In 2011–12, for the second consecutive season, Western Michigan had a new head coach and reached the NCAA tournament. Longtime National Hockey League (NHL) coach Andy Murray was named as coach of the Broncos after Blashill left for the Detroit Red Wings. WMU finished tied for second in the CCHA and won the CCHA tournament, thereby receiving an automatic bid into the NCAA tournament. Western Michigan lost in the first round of the tournament 3–1 to No. 1 seed North Dakota.

The Broncos joined the National Collegiate Hockey Conference (NCHC) starting in the 2013–14 season. The CCHA disbanded after the 2012–13 season, in part due to the addition of men's ice hockey to the Big Ten Conference.

Western Michigan won the 2013 four-team Great Lakes Invitational which was played outdoors at Comerica Park in Detroit. The Broncos defeated No. 3 Michigan 3–2 in overtime in the semifinals, and then claimed the championship by beating Michigan Tech 1–0, also in overtime. WMU won the 2014 Shillelagh Tournament with an 8–2 victory over No. 17 Union. The Broncos also defeated Ohio State in the first round of the tournament, 6–2.

In 2016–17, the Broncos followed up a disappointing 8-25-3 season with an impressive 22-13-5 and a third-place finish in the NCHC. Western Michigan was invited to the final Great Lakes Invitational at Joe Louis Arena, where they defeated Michigan Tech in the championship. WMU has been invited to the GLI 5 times dating back to 1977, winning it 3 of those times. The Broncos were defeated in the first round of the 2017 NCAA Division I tournament by Air Force.

Season-by-season results

Source:

Coaching

All-time coaching records
As of the completion of 2021–22 season

† The 1998–99 season was coached by both Wilkinson and Culhane.

Statistical leaders
Source:

Career points leaders

Career goaltending leaders

GP = Games played; Min = Minutes played; W = Wins; L = Losses; T = Ties; GA = Goals against; SO = Shutouts; SV% = Save percentage; GAA = Goals against average

Minimum 30 games played

Statistics current through the start of the 2022–2023 season.

Current roster
As of August 23, 2022.

Awards and honors

All-Americans 
AHCA First Team All-Americans

1985–86: Wayne Gagné, D; Dan Dorion, F
1986–87: Wayne Gagné, F
2019–20: Hugh McGing, F
2020–21: Ronnie Attard, D
2021–22: Ronnie Attard, D

AHCA Second Team All-Americans

1983–84: Dan Dorion, F
1984–85: Glenn Healy, G
1985–86: Bill Horn, G
1995–96: Marc Magliarditi, G
2000–01: Mike Bishai, F
2011–12: Danny DeKeyser, D
2012–13: Danny DeKeyser, D
2021–22: Ethen Frank, F

CCHA

Individual awards

Player of the Year
Dan Dorion: 1986
Wayne Gagné: 1987

Best Defensive Forward
Pat Ferschweiler: 1992
Dane Walters: 2013

Best Defensive Defenseman
Brent Brekke: 1994
Danny DeKeyser: 2012, 2013

Rookie of the Year
Chris Brooks: 1993
Marc Magliarditi: 1996
Daryl Andrews: 1997
Patrick Dwyer: 2002
Mark Letestu: 2007

Coach of the Year
Bill Wilkinson: 1984, 1986, 1996

Ilitch Humanitarian Award
Brett Beebe: 2013

Most Valuable Player in Tournament
Glenn Healy: 1984
Bill Horn: 1986
Frank Slubowski: 2012

All-Conference teams
First Team All-CCHA

1976–77: Tim Dunlop, F
1980–81: Ross Fitzpatrick, F
1983–84: Dan Dorion, F
1985–86: Wayne Gagné, D; Dan Dorion, F
1986–87: Wayne Gagné, D
1987–88: Paul Polillo, F
1991–92: Keith Jones, G
1995–96: Marc Magliarditi, G
2012–13: Danny DeKeyser, D

Second Team All-CCHA

1977–78: Bernie Saunders, F; Paul Cappuccio, F
1979–80: Bob Scurfield, F
1984–85: Glenn Healy, G
1985–86: Chris MacDonald, F; Stu Burnie, F
1986–87: Bill Horn, G; Rob Bryden, F
1987–88: Mike Posma, D; Ron Hoover, F
1990–91: Mike Eastwood, F
1995–96: Jeremy Brown, F
1996–97: Joe Corvo, D
1999–00: David Gove, F
2000–01: Mike Bishai, F; David Gove, F
2004–05: Brent Walton, F
2008–09: Patrick Galivan, F
2011–12: Danny DeKeyser, D; Matt Tennyson, D
2012–13: Frank Slubowski, G; Luke Witkowski, D

CCHA All-Rookie Team

1991–92: Chris Belanger, D
1992–93: Scott Chartier, D; Chris Brooks, F
1994–95: Steve Duke, D
1995–96: Marc Magliarditi, G; Joe Corvo, D
1996–97: Daryl Andrews, D
2001–02: Patrick Dwyer, F
2002–03: Vince Bellissimo, F
2006–07: Mark Letestu, F
2010–11: Danny DeKeyser, D; Chase Balisy, F
2011–12: Frank Slubowski, G; Garrett Haar, D
2012–13: Kenney Morrison, D

NCHC

Individual awards

Offensive Defenseman of the Year
Ronnie Attard: 2021, 2022

Scholar-Athlete of the Year
Kale Bennett: 2021
Drew Worrad: 2022

Herb Brooks Coach of the Year
Andy Murray: 2017

All-Conference teams
First Team All-NCHC

2019–20: Hugh McGing, F
2020–21: Ronnie Attard, D
2021–22: Ronnie Attard, D; Ethen Frank, F

Second Team All-NCHC

2013–14: Chase Balisy, F
2016–17: Sheldon Dries, F
2018–19: Hugh McGing, F
2019–20: Ronnie Attard, D
2021–22: Drew Worrad, F

NCHC All-Rookie Team

2016–17: Ben Blacker, G
2019–20: Ronnie Attard, D

Western Michigan Broncos Hall of Fame
The following is a list of people associated with the Western Michigan men's ice hockey program who were elected into the Western Michigan University Athletic Hall of Fame.

Dan Dorion (1998)
Ross Fitzpatrick (2004)
Wayne Gagné (2001)
Glenn Healy (1996)
Rob Hodge (2008)
Harry Lawson (1990)
Jamal Mayers (2014)
Bernie Saunders (1994)
Neil Smith (1991)

Broncos in the NHL
As of July 1, 2022

‡Scott Foster played 14 minutes for the Blackhawks after being signed to a 1-day contract as an emergency backup due to injury.

Source:

See also
Western Michigan Broncos

References

External links
Western Michigan Broncos men's ice hockey

 
Ice hockey teams in Michigan